Gerhard Gehring (born 10 April 1945) is a German former skier. He competed at the 1968 Winter Olympics and the 1972 Winter Olympics.

References

External links
 

1945 births
Living people
German male biathletes
German male cross-country skiers
Olympic biathletes of West Germany
Olympic cross-country skiers of West Germany
Biathletes at the 1968 Winter Olympics
Cross-country skiers at the 1972 Winter Olympics
People from Oberallgäu
Sportspeople from Swabia (Bavaria)
20th-century German people